The World Cadet, Junior and U21 Karate Championships, also knows as World Karate Championship Junior are the highest level of competition for karate for U21 athletes organized by the World Karate Federation (WKF). Initiated in 1996 held in Johannesburg, South Africa, the competition is held in a different city every two years.

Age divisions 
Cadets 14-16 / Juniors 16-18 / Espoirs 18-21 (Since 2009)

Weight divisions 
The weight classification in this competition is divided into three categories, which are:

Editions
Source:

8th WORLD CADET & JUNIOR KARATE CHAMPIONSHIPS 3rd UNDER 21 CUP - 2013

1996 Unofficial

All-time medal table
The following reflects the all-time medal counts as of the 2022 U21, Junior & Cadet World Championships:

References 

World Karate Championships
World championships in combat sports
Karate competitions
Recurring sporting events established in 1999